The 2023 European Indoor Archery Championships is the 19th edition of the European Indoor Archery Championships. The event will be held in Samsun, Turkey from February 19 to 24, 2023. A maximum number of three (3) athletes per country can be registered into each category and divisions of the event. This Competition will be organized following the WA and WAE competition rules in divisions Recurve, Compound and Barebow with both age categories of Senior Men and Women and Under 21 Men and Women.

Turkish Archery Federation and LOC must definitely announce the cancellation of the 2023 European Indoor Championships in Samsun due to 2023 Turkey–Syria earthquake. The event was scheduled to be held from February 13 to 18 in the Turkish city of Samsun but has been delayed by one week following the natural disaster.

Competition schedule
All times are (UTC+3)

Medal summary

Recurve

Compound

Barebow

References

External links
2023 Samsun Invitation

European Indoor Championships
Archery European Indoor Championships
European Archery Championships
International archery competitions hosted by Turkey
European Indoor Archery Championships